The Arboretum du Mas du Rouquet is an arboretum located in Pégairolles-de-l'Escalette, Hérault, Languedoc-Roussillon, France. It contains trees including Abies alba, Acer platanoides, Buxus sempervirens, Carpinus betulus, Cedrus atlantica, Fraxinus excelsior, Pinus laricio, Pinus nigra austriaca, Pinus sylvestris, Populus alba, and Ulmus campestris.

See also 
 List of botanical gardens in France

References 
 Inventaire national du Patrimoine naturel: Arboretum du Mas du Rouquet (French)
 Profil Environnemental du Languedoc-Roussillon (French)
 Liste de Znieff de Type 1 (French)

Mas du Rouquet, Arboretum du
Mas du Rouquet, Arboretum du